James Hay (9 February 1881 – 4 April 1940) was a Scottish footballer, who played for Ayr, Celtic, Newcastle United, Ayr United and the Scotland national team.

Hay was born in Tarbolton, Ayrshire and signed for Celtic for £50 from Ayr FC in March 1903. Described as a strong tackler, Hay captained Celtic between 1906 and 1911  and made a total of 322 appearances for the club, scoring 23 goals. He was part of the Celtic side which won six consecutive league titles between season 1904–05 and season 1909–10 under the management of Willie Maley.

He left Celtic in 1911 after the club failed to meet his improved contract demands and joined English club Newcastle United. He returned to Scotland in 1915 with Ayr United, where he remained for three years. He served as a gunner in the Royal Field Artillery during the First World War.

He was capped 11 times by Scotland between 1905 and 1914 and captained his country on three occasions. Hay also represented the Scottish League XI.

Hay was appointed manager of Clydebank in April 1922. He later became manager at former club Ayr United in June 1924. The club were relegated from the First Division in his first season as manager. Hay left the club in January 1926, after he accused Ayr United director Tom Steen of trying to bribe a referee. Hay was banned indefinitely by the Scottish Football Association after he refused to apologise, but the suspension was lifted in November 1927. He later had a career as an insurance agent, until his death on 4 April 1940.

See also
List of Scotland national football team captains

References

External links

International stats at Londonhearts.com

1881 births
1940 deaths
Scottish footballers
Scotland international footballers
Scottish football managers
Celtic F.C. players
Newcastle United F.C. players
Ayr United F.C. players
Ayr United F.C. managers
Scottish Football League players
Scottish Football League representative players
English Football League players
Association football wing halves
Scottish Football League managers
Clydebank F.C. (1914) managers
Ayr F.C. players
Place of death missing
Glossop North End A.F.C. players
Clydebank F.C. (1914) players
British Army personnel of World War I
Royal Field Artillery soldiers
People from Tarbolton
Footballers from South Ayrshire